We Never Sleep is a 1917 American short comedy film featuring Harold Lloyd. It was Lloyd's last film as his "Lonesome Luke" character.

Cast

 Harold Lloyd as Lonesome Luke
 Snub Pollard
 Bebe Daniels
 Gilbert Pratt
 Fred C. Newmeyer
 Billy Fay
 Bud Jamison
 Charles Stevenson (as Charles E. Stevenson)
 Sammy Brooks
 David Voorhees
 Virginia Baynes
 Dorothea Wolbert
 Max Hamburger
 Gus Leonard
 Ruth Churchill
 Golda Madden
 Estelle Harrison
 Ray Braxton
 John Gardner
 Ardulus Bixby
 Rudolph Bylek
 William Blaisdell
 Marie Mosquini
 Evelyn Page
 Nina Speight
 Walter Stile
 Harry Todd
 Margaret Joslin (as Margaret Joslin Todd)

See also
 Harold Lloyd filmography

References

External links

1917 films
1917 comedy films
1917 short films
American silent short films
American black-and-white films
Films directed by Hal Roach
Silent American comedy films
Lonesome Luke films
American comedy short films
1910s American films